Pylaia-Chortiatis is a municipality in the Thessaloniki regional unit, Central Macedonia, Greece, consisting of three suburbs of Thessaloniki. The seat of the municipality is Panorama. The municipality has an area of 155.63 km2.

Municipality
The municipality Pylaia-Chortiatis was formed at the 2011 local government reform by the merger of the following 3 former municipalities, that became municipal units:
Chortiatis
Panorama
Pylaia

References

External links
Official website 

Municipalities of Central Macedonia
Populated places in Thessaloniki (regional unit)